Gaerllwyd is a village in Monmouthshire, south east Wales, United Kingdom.

Location 

History and amenities 

Gaerllwyd is set in a very rural agricultural area in the heart of Monmouthshire.

The village has an old Baptist chapel, situated on the Gaerllwyd Crossroads in close proximity to Earlswood Community Field. The chapel has regular Sunday services. Close to the chapel is a Neolithic burial chamber, or cromlech dated to around 4,000 BC. It is made up of a capstone which would have been supported by three upright stones. The outer cairn has been destroyed by a combination of road construction and stone robbing, although Castleden discusses whether or not a covering mound ever existed. The chamber lies close to a series of Early Bronze Age monuments to the south including two stone circles, a standing stone and a round barrow cemetery.

References

External links
 Gaerllwyd Baptist chapel
 www.geograph.co.uk : photos of Gaerllwyd and surrounding area

Villages in Monmouthshire